M2, M-2, M.2 or M02 may refer to:

Entertainment
 M² (album), a 2001 album by jazz musician Marcus Miller
 m² (artist), an ambient project of Mathis Mootz
 M2 (TV channel), a Hungarian TV channel
 M2 (Ukraine), a Ukrainian music television channel
 M2, a South Korean music television channel

Computing
 M.2, a specification for internally mounted expansion cards
 Apple M2, a central processing unit in the Apple M series
 Socket M2, a CPU socket
 Memory Stick Micro, a removable flash memory card format
 Fast Universal Digital Computer M-2, an early Russian digital computer (1957)
 Opera Mail, formerly known as M2
 Modula-2, a computer programming language
 Macaulay2, a free computer algebra system
 M2 (game developer)

Military

Vehicles
 M2 (missile), a French submarine-launched ballistic missile
 M2 Bradley, an armored fighting vehicle
 M2 half-track car
 M2 light tank
 M2 medium tank
  (M2), a WWI British Royal Navy monitor
 , a 1919 submarine
 , a Swedish Navy mine sweeper
 , a Swedish Royal Navy mine layer
 Miles M.2 Hawk, a 1930s British two-seat light monoplane
 M2 High Speed Tractor, M2 High Speed Tractor aircraft tug

Weapons
 M2 Ball, ammunition
 M2 Browning, a heavy machine gun in use since the 1920s
 M2 carbine, a select-fire carbine
 M2 flamethrower
 M2 Hyde, submachine gun
 M2 mine, a World War II land mine
 M2 mortar, a 60 mm infantry mortar
 M2 tripod, a weapon mount
 Mauser M2, semi-automatic handgun
 M2 Aiming Circle, an optical survey device to measure deflection angles and elevation off a predefined azimuth
 M2 compass (Brunton compass), used for mortars and field artillery; uses 6400 mils as opposed to 360 degrees
 M2 howitzer, the WW2 designation for the M101 howitzer
 M2/M4 Selectable Lightweight Attack Munition (SLAM), a land mine
 Anti-Aircraft Target Rocket M2, a World War II training rocket

Transport

Bus routes
 M2 (New York City bus), a New York City Bus route in Manhattan
 Route M-2 (MTA Maryland), a bus route in Baltimore, Maryland and its suburbs

Metro lines
 M2 (Copenhagen), a line of the Copenhagen Metro, colored yellow on the map
 M2 (Istanbul Metro), a metro line in Turkey
 M2 (Lausanne), part of the Lausanne Metro in Switzerland
 Paris Métro Line 2, part of the Paris Metro in France
 Bucharest Metro Line M2, part of the Bucharest Metro, Romania
 Line 2 (Budapest Metro), the second line of Budapest Metro, Hungary
 Line M2 (Warsaw Metro), the second line of Warsaw Metro, Poland
 Line M2 - Milan Subway (Metropolitana di Milano)

Roads
 List of M2 roads
 M2 (Brisbane), Australia
 M2 (Johannesburg), a Metropolitan Route in Johannesburg, South Africa
 M2 (Pretoria), a Metropolitan Route in Pretoria, South Africa
 M2 (Sydney), Australia
 M2 motorway (Great Britain)

Vehicles
 M2 (railcar), a Metro-North Railroad railcar
 BMW M2, a variant of the BMW 2 Series
 Freightliner M2, a cubetruck and chassis variants
 LNER Class M2, a class of British steam locomotives

Science
 M2 protein, an ion channel in the cell membrane of the influenza A virus
 ATC code M02, Topical products for joint and muscular pain, a subgroup of the Anatomical Therapeutic Chemical Classification System
 British NVC community M2, a mire biological community in the United Kingdom
 Messier 2, a globular cluster in the constellation Aquarius
 Muscarinic acetylcholine receptor M2, a muscarinic receptor for acetylcholine found mainly in the heart
 M2 or M2, the principal lunar semi-diurnal constituent of tides on Earth
 M2, a form of high speed steel in the tungsten-molybdenum series
 M2 macrophage, a phenotype of macrophage
 M2 (economics), a measure of the money supply

Other
 M2 (Mazda), a marketing approach by Mazda
 M2 Group, an Australian seller of telecommunications services, power, gas, and insurance products
 M-2 visa, a type of United States visa for the dependents of an individual with an M-1 visa
 Leica M2, a 35 mm rangefinder camera introduced in 1957
 Panasonic M2, a video game console design
 m2 or square metre, a unit of area
 M2, one of the ISO metric screw thread sizes
 M2 World Championship, the second esports world championship for the mobile game Mobile Legends: Bang Bang held in 2021
 M2, a difficulty grade in mixed climbing

See also 

 
 
 
 M² (disambiguation)
 MII (disambiguation)
 Model 2 (disambiguation)
 MM (disambiguation)
 2M (disambiguation)